Acacia rothii, commonly known as tooroo, Roth's wattle, lancewood and spoon tree, is a shrub of the genus Acacia and the subgenus Plurinerves that is endemic to an are in north eastern Australia.

Description
It has rough dark grey-brown coloured bark and angular glabrous branchlets. Like most species of Acacia it has phyllodes rather than true leaves.

Taxonomy
The species was first formally described by the botanist Frederick Manson Bailey in 1900 as a part of the work Contributions to the Flora of Queensland as published in the Queensland Agricultural Journal. In 1987 it was reclassified as Racosperma rothii by Leslie Pedley then transferred back to genus Acacia in 2001.
It is closely related to and closely resembles Acacia mimula and is thought to be closely related to Acacia bakeri.

Distribution
It is usually found growing in lateritic red earth sandy or loamy soils as a part of Eucalyptus woodland communities. The range of the plant extends from the northern tip of the Cape York Peninsula down to the Palmer River in the south.

See also
List of Acacia species

References

rothii
Flora of Queensland
Taxa named by Frederick Manson Bailey
Plants described in 1900